Dragon Tiger Gate is a 2006 Hong Kong martial arts action film directed by Wilson Yip and featuring fight choreography by Donnie Yen, who also stars in the film. The film is based on the manhua Oriental Heroes, which bears the same Chinese title as the film. The film's release in all English-speaking territories is handled by The Weinstein Company.

Plot

Dragon Tiger Gate is an academy established by two powerful martial artists. It aims to train students in martial arts in order to uphold justice and combat the threat of the Triad. It is also a haven for children who had been orphaned by the Triad. While Luocha Cult is a Pan-Asia heretic cult/drug trafficking organization led by the dictating might of its cult leader: Shibumi the Jashin of Frame Cloud. Shibumi, who is the only master of the legendary Yijin Jing and has many fearsome Kung Fu masters at his disposal, controls the entire Asia-Pacific Underground Drug market with Hong Kong as his base of operations.

The story begins with the two sons of Fu Hu Wong, one of the founders of the academy, who were each born to different mothers. The older is named Dragon and the younger is named Tiger. When the boys were young, Dragon's mother left the academy and gave Dragon half of a Jade amulet pendant and told him that his half-brother, Tiger, has the other half. When Dragon's mother was killed in a fire, Dragon was taken under the care of the Triad boss, Ma Kun, and he grew up to become his bodyguard. Ma Kun's gang is a subject of the evil Luocha Cult, which supervises Hong Kong's Drug dealing on its behalf. Tiger was raised by his elder uncle, Master Xian Lung Wong, after his parents' disappearance.

Several years later, Tiger and his friends are dining in a restaurant and encounter Ma Kun and his men, who are receiving the Luocha Plaque. A symbol of authority within the Luocha Cult indicates that the holder is second only to the cult's leader, Shibumi. Ma Kun and the leader of the White Lions Gang were arguing over the plaque when Tiger accidentally interrupts the meeting. One of Tiger's friends makes off with the plaque while Tiger starts a fight with the gangsters. Just then, Dragon appears and fights Tiger, whom he does not recognize to be his half-brother. Ma Kun calls for Dragon to pull back.

Later that night, Dragon confronts Tiger and his friends at a Japanese restaurant to take back the plaque. Tiger and his friends have been drugged by Scaly, one of Ma Kun's lackeys, who also wanted to retrieve the plaque to prove to his boss that he is the better man. Scaly and his followers fight Dragon over possession of the plaque. Turbo Shek, another eater at the restaurant, is aroused by the commotion and he joins the fight on Dragon's side. Dragon and Turbo defeat Scaly and his men and Dragon takes back the plaque from Tiger. Just then, Tiger discovers that Dragon has the other half of the jade amulet pendant and realizes that Dragon is his half-brother.

Turbo follows Tiger back to Dragon Tiger Gate, wanting to be enrolled into the academy to improve his martial arts skills. He is refused by the current leader of the academy, Master Wong, for his arrogance. Dismayed, Turbo waits outside the academy and promises not to leave unless he is accepted as a student. Master Wong agrees to spar with Turbo and defeats him easily. Turbo is humbled and accepted by Master Wong as a student.

Meanwhile, Ma Kun returns the Luocha Plaque to signify his retirement. He is supported by Dragon, who wants to return to Dragon Tiger Gate, and his daughter Ma Xiaoling, who wants a simple life. Shibumi sees this as an insult and sends his henchmen, the Double Devils, to kill Ma Kun. He uses his subordinate Rosa to lure Dragon away while his minions kill Ma Kun. Dragon returns to rescue Ma Kun, but it is too late. Dragon slays the Double Devils after a vicious fight and leaves Ma Xiaoling in his brother's care before leaving. Although he collapses on a grassland after succumbing to his wounds, he survives after having a vision of his young self giving him the jade pendant (his mother once gave him). Meanwhile, Tiger befriends the grieving Ma Xiaoling.

Shibumi was impressed with Dragon for defeating his henchmen and goes to Dragon Tiger Gate to issue a challenge. With Dragon absent, Master Wong, Tiger, and Turbo takes on Shibumi's challenge but were no match for him. As Master Wong had managed to put up a fight before being defeated, he is deemed worthy enough to die at Shibumi's hands while Shibumi spares the severely wounded Tiger and Turbo for their lack of skill. Ma Xiaoling, realizing that Shibumi will eventually come back for her and the rest of them and with Dragon not there, they would lose just as they had this time, brings Tiger and Turbo to Mount Baiyun to seek help from Master Qi as Dragon senses the passing of Master Wong and returns only to find the demolished Dragon Tiger Gate as he realizes he is too late to protect Master Wong, his brother and Xiaoling and screams in sadness before collapsing. Master Qi heals the wounded Tiger and Turbo and trains them for their incoming final battle with Shibumi, including teaching new martial arts techniques: Spinning Lightning Dragon Kick and Invulnerable Golden Bell Technique. Dragon also practices to fight Shibumi for the first and final time after having reminisced of his time with Xiaoling and appears to have developed a new one.

Tiger and Turbo storm Shibumi's Black Pagoda to stop his reign of terror once and for all and engage him in a fierce fight, using all their greatly improved martial arts abilities and the new techniques they have learned to battle him. However, despite putting up a far better fight than before and even being praised by Shibumi for their improved abilities, Tiger and Turbo are ultimately still outmatched and severely beaten. As Shibumi mocks them for having embarrassed the techniques they have learned and is about to finally kill them, Dragon appears to engage Shibumi, tossing the Plaque back in honor of the Gate, and after luring Shibumi away from his injured brother and Turbo, engages him calmly with his improved abilities as he gains the upper hand and even mocks Shibumi to provoke his temper, eventually killing him with his Eighteen Subduing Dragon Palms technique. Before the film ends, Dragon returns to Dragon Tiger Gate together with Tiger and Turbo (who decides to change his name to Leopard) to carry on Master Wong's legacy.

Cast
Donnie Yen as Dragon Wong / Wong Siu Long
Howard Sit as young Dragon
Nicholas Tse as Tiger Wong
Tam Chun-ho as young Tiger
Shawn Yue as Turbo Shek / Dragon Long
Dong Jie as Ma Xiaoling
Isabella Leong as Ma Xiaoling (voice)
Chen Kuan-tai as Ma Kun
Yu Kang as Shibumi
Louis Koo as Shibumi (voice)
Li Xiaoran as Lousha
Ella Koon as Lousha (voice)
Chan Kwan-king as young Lousha
Yuen Wah as Master Wong
Wong Yuk-long as Master Qi
Vincent Sze as Scaly
Tommy Yuen as Xing
Sam Chan as Ming
Alan Lam as Patch
Nick Lam as Hei
Xing Yu as Fan
Yan Hua as Stick
Sheren Tang as Dragon's mother

Sequel

In a Hong Kong interview with the production crew, it was quoted that the cast and crew intends to create a sequel to expand the story on screen by summer of 2007. However, with the original cast committed to a long list of other projects, there has been no indication of any level of production or completion by the announced date. As of now, there has been no further mention of a sequel.

References

External links

Dragon Tiger Gate at the Hong Kong Movie Database
Dragon Tiger Gate on LoveAsianFilm.com
Dragon Tiger Gate plot synopsis on donnieyen.com

2006 films
Films based on Hong Kong comics
2006 action films
2006 martial arts films
2000s Cantonese-language films
Hong Kong action films
Hong Kong martial arts films
Kung fu films
Films directed by Wilson Yip
Live-action films based on comics
Films scored by Kenji Kawai
Triad films
2000s Hong Kong films